Bethuel ( – Bəṯūʾēl), in the Hebrew Bible, was an Aramean man, the youngest son of Nahor and Milcah, the nephew of Abraham, and the father of Laban and Rebecca.

Bethuel was also a town in the territory of the tribe of Simeon, west of the Dead Sea. Some scholars identify it with Bethul and Bethel in southern Judah, to which David gives part of the spoils of his combat with the Amalekites. Bethel, a wisdom school, was in Padam Aram (the field of Aram) which is in Syria. Aram is a son of Shem.

Hebrew Bible
The man Bethuel appears nine times in nine verses in the Hebrew Bible, all in Genesis.  Adherents of the documentary hypothesis often attribute most of these verses to the Jahwist source, and the remainder to the priestly source.

Bethuel the Syrian lived in Padan-aram, and is a descendant of Terah. Bethuel's uncle Abraham sent his senior servant to  Padan-aram to find a wife for his son Isaac. By the well outside the city of Nahor, in Aram-naharaim, the servant met Bethuel's daughter Rebekah. The servant told Rebekah's household his good fortune in meeting Bethuel's daughter, Abraham's relative. Laban and Bethuel answered, “The matter was decreed by the LORD; we cannot speak to you bad or good.  Here is Rebekah before you; take her and go, and let her be a wife to your master’s son, as the LORD has spoken.”

After meeting Abraham's servant, Rebekah “ran and told all this to her mother’s household”, that Rebekah's “brother and her mother said, ‘Let the maiden remain with us some ten days’”, and that “they sent off their sister Rebekah and her nurse along with Abraham’s servant and his men. And they blessed Rebekah and said to her, ‘O sister!  May you grow into thousands of myriads.” Some scholars thus hypothesize that mention of Bethuel in Gen. 24:50 was a late addition to the preexisting story. Other scholars argue that these texts indicate that Bethuel was somehow incapacitated. Other scholars attribute the emphasis on the mother's role to a matrilineal family structure. Despite the obvious importance of Rebekah's mother in the narrative of this bible passage, scholars have yet to reveal the name of Rebekah's mother.  Some sources indicate that the name of Rebekah's mother is not revealed because she was not of the same tribe.

A generation later, Isaac sent Jacob back to Padan-aram to take a wife from among Bethuel's granddaughters, rather than from among the Canaanites.

Rabbinic interpretation
In the Talmud, Rabbi Isaac called Bethuel a wicked man. The midrash identified Bethuel as a king.

The Book of Jasher lists the children of Bethuel as Sahar, Laban, and their sister Rebecca.

In the Talmud, Rab in the name of Rabbi Reuben b. Estrobile cited Laban's and Bethuel's response to Abraham's servant that “The matter was decreed by the Lord” as a proof text for the proposition that God destines a woman and a man for each other in marriage.  Rabbi Joshua b. Rabbi Nehemiah in the name of Rabbi Hanina b. Isaac said that the decree with regard to Rebekah that Laban and Bethuel acknowledged came from Mount Moriah.

Noting that  reports that the next day, Rebekah's “brother and her mother said, ‘Let the maiden remain with us some ten days’”, the Rabbis asked:  “Where was Bethuel?”  The midrash concluded that Bethuel wished to hinder Rebekah's marriage, and so he was smitten during the night. (Genesis Rabbah 60:12.)  The Rabbis said that Abraham's servant did not disclose Bethuel's fate to Isaac.

In his retelling of the story, Josephus reported that Rebekah told Abraham's servant, “my father was Bethuel, but he is dead; and Laban is my brother; and, together with my mother, takes care of all our family affairs, and is the guardian of my virginity.”

See also

Bethuel M. Webster (1900–1989), American lawyer and founder of Webster & Sheffield

Notes

Book of Genesis people
Hebrew Bible cities
Vayeira
Arameans